Pyrrharctia is a genus of moths in the family Erebidae described by Packard in 1864. The species are known from North and Central America.

Species
 Pyrrharctia isabella (Smith, 1797) – isabella tiger moth
 Pyrrharctia genini (Debauche, 1938)

References

Spilosomina
Moth genera